, born December 1, 1988, is a Japanese actor best known for his role as Fujiyama Shuntaro in  and as his minor roles in such works as The Incite Mill,  and Kaitō Royale.

Filmography

Film
 The Incite Mill (2010)
 Gakudori (2011)
 Ouran High School Host Club (2012) – Tōgō-in Makoto (American football Deputy)
  (2012) – Fujiyama Shuntaro
 Torihada: Gekijouban (2012)
 Peach Girl (2017)

Television
  (2010) – Mikumo Gota 
  (2010) – Aoe Shinichiro
  (2011) – Futaba Ran
 Kaitō Royale (2011) – Shuhei Kazuki
  (2012) – Katsumi Takemura
  (2012) – Hayato Kudo
 Ashita Switch (2012) – Himself
  (2012 TV Mini-Series) – Akira imaizumi (ep 7)
  (2013 TV Mini-Series) – Alberto José Tanaka (ep 8)
  (2013 TV Mini-Series) – Masashi Kaneda
 Matori no onna: Kōsei Rōdōshō Mayaku Torishimarikan (2014 TV Movie)
 Sanbiki no ossan (2014 TV Mini-Series)
  (2014 TV Mini-Series) – Okazaki Hayato (ep 4-5)
 Shinigami kun (2014 TV Mini-Series) – Nagatomo Yusuke (ep 9)
  (2014 TV Mini-Series) – Masashi Kaneda
  (2014 TV Mini-Series) – Seiya

Stage
 Romeo and Juliet (2014) as Paris

References

External links
 
 

1988 births
Living people
21st-century Japanese male actors
Male actors from Tokyo